Besnik Ferati (born 19 April 2000) is a Macedonian footballer who plays as a midfielder for Akademija Pandev in the Macedonian First Football League.

Career

Partizani Tirana
In August 2018, Ferati joined the club on a free transfer. He made his Albanian Superliga debut on 18 May 2019, playing the entirety of a 2-0 away defeat to Teuta Durrës.

References

External links

2000 births
Living people
FK Partizani Tirana players
Kategoria Superiore players
Macedonian footballers
North Macedonia youth international footballers
Association football midfielders
Macedonian expatriate footballers
Albanian footballers from North Macedonia